John Lloyd (born 27 August 1954) is a British former professional tennis player.  Lloyd reached an ATP world ranking of 21 from 23 July 1978 to 30 July 1978, and was ranked as UK number 1 in 1984 and 1985.  He now works as a sports commentator.

During his career, he reached one Grand Slam singles final and won three Grand Slam mixed doubles titles with tennis partner Wendy Turnbull: the French Open in 1982 and Wimbledon in 1983 and 1984. Also, Lloyd scored 27 wins and 24 losses with the Great Britain Davis Cup team.

He was the first husband of the former top woman player Chris Evert and is the younger brother of the former British Davis Cup captain David Lloyd.  He served as the British Davis Cup captain himself from August 2006 until March 2010.
He is a member of the All England Lawn Tennis and Croquet Club.

Education
Lloyd was educated at Southend High School for Boys, a state grammar school in Southend-on-Sea in Essex, in southeast England.

Life and career
At the Australian Open in December 1977, Lloyd became the first British male tennis player in the Open era to reach a Grand Slam singles final. He lost in five sets to America's Vitas Gerulaitis 6–3, 7–6, 5–7, 3–6, 6–2. No other British player reached a Grand Slam final for 20 years, until British-Canadian Greg Rusedski reached the US Open final in 1997. In 1984 he reached the quarter-finals of the US Open. Lloyd never progressed beyond the third round in singles play at Wimbledon.

Though he never won a Grand Slam singles title, Lloyd did win three Grand Slam mixed doubles titles partnering Australia's Wendy Turnbull, beginning with the French Open mixed doubles in 1982. The pair finished runners-up in the mixed doubles at Wimbledon that year, and then went on to win the Wimbledon mixed doubles crown in both 1983 and 1984.

Lloyd's career-high singles ranking was World No. 21 in 1978. He was a member of the British team that reached the final of the Davis Cup that year with Lloyd himself losing in straight sets in the singles to Brian Gottfried and to a 19-year-old John McEnroe. As a player, he represented the British Davis Cup team for 11 years.
His career-high doubles ranking was World No. 34 in 1986.
As his playing career came to an end, Lloyd stayed within the tennis world, finding work as a coach and television commentator, and appearing on the veterans circuit.

In 2006, Lloyd was appointed the captain of Great Britain's Davis Cup team, replacing Jeremy Bates. Lloyd's reign started very well, with successive victories taking the team back into the World Group, but after the retirement of both Greg Rusedski and Tim Henman in 2007 the team suffered five successive defeats, their worst run in Davis Cup history, to drop back down to the third tier of the competition. Lloyd resigned as coach in mid-2010.

Commentator
Since the 1990s, Lloyd has been a commentator and analyst for the BBC's tennis coverage, particularly at Wimbledon. Lloyd is known for his trademark catchphrases, using the analogy of food and drink to describe tennis shots. For example, if a shot is too weak he will claim that it was "undercooked" or "needed more mustard." Conversely, if a shot is overhit he will describe it as "overcooked", having "too much juice", or "having too much mustard."

He worked for Sky Sports on their coverage of the US Open 2009.

Personal life

In 1979, Lloyd married the World No. 1 woman player, American Chris Evert (who became Chris Evert-Lloyd). The media-styled "golden couple" of tennis enjoyed several years in the limelight before a separation, a short-lived reconciliation, and eventual divorce in 1987. Because of Evert's higher profile tennis career, Lloyd was sometimes jokingly referred to in the press as "Mr. Evert". Aware of this negative impact on his psyche, Evert attempted to boost Lloyd's standing by the couple always insisting on being billed or announced as "International tennis star John Lloyd and his wife Chris" whenever they made personal appearances together in the UK or Australia. Their biographer Carol Thatcher (a friend of the couple) observed that this was akin to the ridiculousness of her own parents being announced as "International business executive Denis Thatcher and his wife Margaret".

In 1987 Lloyd married Deborah Taylor-Bellman, an American dancing teacher, their marriage lasting 30 years, until 2017. They have two children, Aiden and Hayley. Lloyd has recounted how getting a divorce may have unintentionally helped saved his life since on moving to Florida in the US following his divorce he was diagnosed with prostate cancer, which then could be treated in time. Lloyd currently lives in Palm Beach, Florida, with his girlfriend Svetlana Carroll, a Russian-born estate agent.

Lloyd is a supporter of the football team Wolverhampton Wanderers. It is because of Lloyd's influence that Andy Murray is also a Wolves fan (although Murray's 'first' club is Hibernian FC) and is often seen wearing the Wolves shirt that was presented to him by Lloyd.

Grand Slam finals

Singles (1 runner-up)

Mixed doubles (3 titles, 1 runner-up)

Grand Slam tournament performance timeline

Singles

Note: The Australian Open was held twice in 1977, in January and December.

Career finals

Singles: 5 (1 title, 4 runners-up)

Doubles: 10 (2 titles, 8 runners-up)

References and notes

External links
 
 
 

1954 births
Living people
English expatriate sportspeople in the United States
English male tennis players
French Open champions
English tennis commentators
Wimbledon champions
Grand Slam (tennis) champions in mixed doubles
People from Leigh-on-Sea
Tennis people from Essex
British male tennis players